John Tandrevold (13 January 1927 – 28 January 2013) was a Norwegian boxer. He competed in the men's light middleweight event at the 1952 Summer Olympics.

References

1927 births
2013 deaths
Norwegian male boxers
Olympic boxers of Norway
Boxers at the 1952 Summer Olympics
Sportspeople from Stavanger
Light-middleweight boxers